Norbert Gasser (born 18 May 1957) is an Italian ice hockey player. He competed in the men's tournament at the 1984 Winter Olympics.

References

External links
 

1957 births
Living people
Italian ice hockey players
Olympic ice hockey players of Italy
Ice hockey players at the 1984 Winter Olympics
Ice hockey people from Bolzano
Bolzano HC players